Antonio Tremaine Horne (born March 21, 1976) is a former professional football wide receiver and return specialist who played three season in the National Football League (NFL) with the St. Louis Rams.

He attended Richmond Senior High in Rockingham, North Carolina, where he was a quarterback and a wide receiver in college at Clemson University. 
Horne played college football at Clemson University.  As a senior in 1997, he caught a school record 70 passes for 907 yards and 8 touchdowns, while also returning 32 punts for 332 yards and another score, along with 19 kickoff returns for 536 yards.  He finished his four seasons there with 120 receptions for 1,750 yards and 13 touchdowns, as well as 1,133 yards on special teams.

NFL career
Undrafted, Horne played the 1998, 1999, and 2000 seasons with the St. Louis Rams. In 1998, he finished sixth in the NFL with 1,306 yards on kick returns. 
He added 892 yards in 1999 with a league leading 29.7 yards per return average, and was an important contributor to the Rams 1999 Super Bowl winning team, scoring two kickoff return touchdowns during the season and one more during the playoffs. 
He gained 1,379 in 11 games in 2000, when he again finished sixth in the league.  

In 2001, he signed on as a free agent with the Kansas City Chiefs before suffering a knee injury during that preseason that ended his pro career.  He finished his three seasons with 143 kickoff returns for 3,577 yards and 4 touchdowns.

Post NFL
Horne works as a strength and speed coach at D1 Sports Training in Greenville.

References

1976 births
Living people
American football wide receivers
American football return specialists
St. Louis Rams players
Kansas City Chiefs players
Clemson Tigers football players